Najibullah Haqqani is the current Minister of Communications of the Islamic Emirate of Afghanistan since 7 September 2021. He has also served various ministries in the previous government (1996–2001). He is a cousin of Noor Jalal, the Deputy Interior Minister from 7 to 21 September 2021.

References

Living people
Taliban government ministers of Afghanistan
Year of birth missing (living people)